The F140 engine family is a series of 65° DOHC V12 petrol engines produced by Ferrari since 2002, and used in both Ferrari and Maserati cars. This engine was derived from the Ferrari/Maserati V8.
In the Enzo Ferrari, it set the record for the most powerful naturally aspirated engine in a road car. The 5998.8 cc engine, designed for the Enzo, is known within Ferrari as the Tipo F140B, whereas the very similar Tipo F140C engine displaces 5998.8 cc and was designed for the 599 as the most powerful series-production Ferrari engine, a trend that has continued with the F12 and 812. This engine is also used in Maserati Birdcage 75th. For Tipo F140EB displacement was enlarged to 6262.456 cc and debuted in FF. Latest enlargement saw Tipo F140GA at 6495.6 cc and is now used in 812.

Applications

Ferrari usage

Road engines

Racing engines

Non-Ferrari usage
F140 E Apollo Intensa Emozione (2019-present)

Maserati usage

Road engines

Racing engines

Specifications

Awards
The F140 engine family has won a total of 6 awards in the International Engine of the Year competition.
In 2013 the F140 FC V12 engine used in the Ferrari F12berlinetta was awarded "Best Performance Engine" and "Above 4.0 litre" recognitions.
The F12tdf engine has won the "Above 4.0 litre" category in 2016 and 2017. In 2018 the 812 Superfast powerplant was recognised as "Best New Engine" and gave Ferrari another "Above 4.0 litre" class win.

References

External links
 How the Ferrari Enzo works
 Ferrari World
 Ferrari 599XX Evoluzione

Ferrari engines
Maserati
Gasoline engines by model
V12 engines